Maxwell's theorem is the following statement about triangles in the plane.

The theorem is named after the physicist James Clerk Maxwell (1831–1879), who proved it in his work on reciprocal figures, which are of importance in statics.

References 
 Daniel Pedoe: Geometry: A Comprehensive Course. Dover, 1970, pp. 35–36, 114–115
 Daniel Pedoe: "On (what should be) a Well-Known Theorem in Geometry." The American Mathematical Monthly, Vol. 74, No. 7 (August – September, 1967), pp. 839–841 (JSTOR)
Dao Thanh Oai, Cao Mai Doai, Quang Trung, Kien Xuong, Thai Binh: "Generalizations of some famous classical Euclidean geometry theorems." International Journal of Computer Discovered Mathematics, Vol. 1, No. 3, pp. 13–20

External links 

 Maxwell's Theorem at cut-the-knot.org

Elementary geometry
Theorems about triangles